Hermeuptychia fallax is a species of butterfly in the family Nymphalidae. It was described by Baron Cajetan von Felder and his son Rudolf Felder in 1862. It is found in Peru and Brazil.

Subspecies
Hermeuptychia fallax fallax (Peru)
Hermeuptychia fallax marinha Anken, 1994 (Brazil: Rio de Janeiro)

References

Butterflies described in 1862
Euptychiina
Fauna of Brazil
Nymphalidae of South America